Gehrig is a German surname.  It is a variant of Gehring.  Notable people with the surname include:

Adelaide Gehrig (1887–1944), American fencer
Eric Gehrig (born 1987), American soccer (football) player
Fraser Gehrig (born 1976), Australian rules footballer
Lou Gehrig (1903–1941), American baseball player

See also
5891 Gehrig, a main-belt asteroid named for Lou Gehrig

German-language surnames
Surnames from given names